Herbert Ernest "Zeke" Meyer (March 19, 1891 – April 27, 1962) was an American racecar driver.  He was not related to fellow driver Louis Meyer.

Indianapolis 500 results

References

1891 births
1962 deaths
Sportspeople from Cranston, Rhode Island
Racing drivers from Rhode Island
Racing drivers from Philadelphia
Indianapolis 500 drivers
AAA Championship Car drivers